Jean Pépin may refer to:
Jean François Théophile Pépin (1826 – 1904), known as Théophile Pépin, French mathematician
 (1924 – 2005), French philosopher
Jean-Luc Pépin (1924-1995), Canadian politician and academic